Silver Star is an unincorporated community in Madison County, Montana, United States. The community has a post office in operation today, and still has its own ZIP code, 59751.

Green Campbell made the first gold discovery in this area in 1866. The community was named for the Silver Star mining claim. The post office opened in 1869.

Demographics

References

Unincorporated communities in Madison County, Montana
Unincorporated communities in Montana